Bekvalac is a surname of Serbian origin. Notable people with the surname include:

 Dragoljub Bekvalac (born 1952), Serbian footballer and manager
 Nataša Bekvalac (born 1980), Serbian singer and actress

See also
 

Serbian surnames